This articles shows the full summary or complete list of contestants from Vietnam's Next Top Model in all cycles together with their active participation in their respective cycles and placements they had finished. Each cycle's prizes may vary depending on the season's winner.

Contestants
(ages stated are at time of contest)

See also
 List of Asia's Next Top Model contestants
 List of America's Next Top Model contestants

External links 
 Vietnam's Next Top Model Official Site
 Tranh theu chu thap
 Application Form

Vietnam's Next Top Model
2010s Vietnamese television series
 
Vietnam's Next Top Model contestants